William McCabe was an Irish international footballer who played club football for Ulster as a forward.

McCabe earned one cap for Ireland in 1891.

External links
NIFG profile

Year of birth missing
Year of death missing
Irish association footballers (before 1923)
Pre-1950 IFA international footballers
Ulster F.C. players
Association football forwards